Emilio Azcárraga Vidaurreta (2 March 1895, Tampico, Tamaulipas – 23 September 1972, Mexico City) was a Mexican businessman who built an entertainment conglomerate.

The son of Basque immigrants Mariano Azcárraga and Emilia Vidaurreta, his primary education was in Piedras Negras, Coahuila, middle school in San Antonio, Texas, and high school in Austin.

Early career
Aged 17, he was employed at a shoe store while he studied trade and economics by night. 

He obtained distribution rights for a shoe manufacturer in Boston and, at age 23, he created the car distribution company, Azcárraga & Copland.

Radio broadcasting industry
In 1923, Azcárraga obtained a license to distribute radios from the Victor Talking Machine Company. Around the same time his brother Raúl Azcárraga Vidaurreta had created a radio station with Mexico City's newspaper El Universal. While working at the "Mexico Music" division of RCA) he became more interested in the radio broadcasting industry. On 19 March 1930 the radio station XET-AM was founded in Monterrey. And on September 18 Azcárraga created the XEW-AM with Mexico Music Corporation as major stockholder. The station was also part of the NBC division of RCA.

Television industry
Azcárraga Vidaurreta established Estudios Churubusco in the 1940s and created the first TV station in Mexico, Channel 2, in 1951. He became the first president of Telesistemas Mexicanos in 1955. His entertainment conglomerate was composed of 92 different business units by 1969. He died on 23 September 1972, before establishment of Televisa, S.A., a television production company on 1 January 1973.

Family
Emilio married Laura Milmo Hickman, daughter of Patricio Milmo Vidaurri, an American citizen, and Laura Hickman Morales. She was the granddaughter of Patricio Milmo O'Dowd (né Patrick Milmo (1826–1899), son of Darby and Sarah (née O'Dowd) Milmo of Lisaneena, Collooney, County Sligo, Ireland), a major stockholder in the Milmo National Bank of Laredo) and his wife, María Prudenciana Vidaurri Vidaurri (a descendant of the Vásquez Borregos, who helped to found Laredo, Texas).

Emilio Azcárraga and Laura Milmo had three children: Emilio, Laura, and Carmela. In 1899 Patricio Milmo and Sons was established as a bank to invest in such interests as railroads and mines. After the Mexican Revolution the company focused on safer investments, like the then-recently-developing radio industry.

See also
Azcárraga family

References

External links
 Biography at the Revista Mexicana de Comunicación of the Manuel Buendía Foundation.
 Biography at the Salón del Empresario en México ("Entrepreneur Hall of Fame in Mexico").
 History of the XEW-AM.

1895 births
1972 deaths
Maria Moors Cabot Prize winners
Mexican chief executives
Mexican people of Basque descent
People from Tampico, Tamaulipas
Mexican radio company founders
Mexican television company founders
Emilio Azcarrafa Vidaurreta
Mexican television executives
Chairmen of Televisa